Joe Belmont was the stage name of Joseph Walter Fulton (July 22, 1876 - August 29, 1949) who was a whistling performer and baritone in the United States who came to be known as "The Human Bird". He was one of the most popular recording artists in the years leading to 1900 and sang as a baritone and whistled for the Columbia Quartet along with Albert Campbell, Jim Reynard and Joe Majors. His top-selling records included "Beautiful Birds, Sing On", "Tell Me, Pretty Maiden" (with Byron G. Harlan, Frank C. Stanley, and the Florodora Girls, Columbia 31604, 1901).

Biography
Joseph Walter Fulton was born in Shamokin, Pennsylvania on July 22, 1876.  When Joseph was eight years old his family moved to Charles Town, West Virginia, and while there he studied the piano and became skilled in imitating birds through whistling. His talent was discovered in 1892 and he began performing at the theater.  In 1894 he made his first recordings for the Columbia Phonograph Company, by which time he began using his professional name. He would later also record for Edison and at least forty other phonograph firms.  By 1900 he was considered as one of the very most popular recording artists.  He became a top theater draw, appearing not only across the United States but also in Europe, Australia, and even Fiji.  He made several recordings for European companies while on a 1908 tour there, including a remarkable session for Germany's Favorite Records that resulted in ten issued sides. Dental problems led to his retirement from whistling after which he performed for the Ziegfeld Follies in the 1920s with the "Belmont Canary Opera" show consisting of trained singing and talking birds where he was assisted by Virginia, a dancer who later married his son Walter Joseph. Belmont also started a birds-only pet shop in Radio City named the Belmont Bird and Kennel Shop, assisted by his son Walter and daughter-in-law Virginia.  Belmont's last recording was made in 1929 for Columbia, the company he started with, in a recording featuring his canaries.  Joe Belmont died on August 28, 1949.  Virginia Belmont did shows and recordings with trained singing and talking birds on her own and ran the store until the early 1980s.

Belmont's most popular recordings as a solo artist were "The Mocking Bird" and his own composition, "Beautiful Birds, Sing On."  According to Joel Whitburn's estimations, overall his best-selling record was "Tell Me Pretty Maiden" in an ensemble with Byron G. Harlan, Frank C. Stanley and "The Floradora Girls" in a 1901 recording for Columbia.

Belmont sang in addition to his whistling.  He sang the baritone part in the first recordings of the "Columbia Quartette".  Belmont claimed to have "discovered" Henry Burr by bringing his attention to Columbia recording engineer George Emerson.

Recorded compositions
The Blacksmith and the Bird
The Blue Jay and the Thrush
Beautiful Birds, Sing On
Gentle Spring Is Here Again
How Birds Make Love
The Merry Farmer Boys
The Nightingale
On an Afternoon in June
The Songs of the Nations
Whistle While You Walk
The Whistling Coquette

References

External links 
 Joe Belmont Recordings
 Virginia Belmont recordings
 Joseph Belmont recordings at the Discography of American Historical Recordings.

1876 births
1949 deaths
Whistlers
American impressionists (entertainers)
Edison Records artists
Pioneer recording artists
Columbia Records artists
Victor Records artists
People from Charles Town, West Virginia